Cadrete is a small town in north-east Spain, close to Zaragoza. It is notable for its Muslim castle, Mudejar Church and famous Cardoons. More recently, a massive wind-turbine has been installed at less than 300 metres away from the village, producing several landscape damages and high noise rates for town's inhabitants.

History
Cadrete (Qadrit in Arabic) was founded as an Moorish settlement within Al-Andalus. The Moors built a fortress on top of a steep hill around which the medieval town developed. The old mosque was later converted into a Moorish-style church during the period of the Reconquest.

References

External links 
 

Municipalities in the Province of Zaragoza